Enrique González Rojo (October 5, 1928 – March 5, 2021) was a Mexican writer, philosopher and teacher.

Biography 
González Rojo was the only son of the writer Enrique González Rojo. After the death of his father, he grew up at his grandfather Enrique González Martínez, and the family decided, that the name of his father should not get lost. In 1959, he obtained the teacher's degree and a doctorate in philosophy. He taught at the Faculty of Philosophy and Literature of the Universidad Nacional Autónoma de México and at Universidad Autónoma Metropolitana, as well as the Universidad Michoacana de San Nicolás de Hidalgo and the Universidad Autónoma de Chapingo.

Selected works 
 Para deletrear el infinito I, 1972
 Para leer a Althusser, 1974
 El quíntuple balar de mis sentidos, 1976
 Teoría científica de la historia, 1977
 La Revolución proletario-intellectual, 1981
 Por los siglos de los siglos, 1981
 Para deletrear el infinito II, 1985
 Epistemología y socialismo, 1986-1988 (six volumes)
 Para deletrear el Infinito III, 1988
 Las huestes de Heráclito, 1988
 Apolo musageta, 1989
 El Junco, 2000
 La cantata del árbol que camina, 2000
 Memoralia del sol, 2002
 Viejos, 2002

 Awards 
 Xavier Villaurrutia Award, 1976 for El quíntuple balar de mis sentidos Premio Latinoamericano de Poesía y Cuento “Benemérito de América”, 2002, for Viejos''

References

External links 
 

1928 births
2021 deaths
Mexican male writers
Mexican philosophers
Writers from Mexico City
Academic staff of the National Autonomous University of Mexico
Academic staff of Universidad Autónoma Metropolitana
Academic staff of Universidad Michoacana de San Nicolás de Hidalgo
Academic staff of the Chapingo Autonomous University
20th-century Mexican male writers
21st-century Mexican male writers